Flora is a town in Madison County, Mississippi, United States. The population was 1,886 at the 2010 census. It is part of the Jackson Metropolitan Statistical Area.

The town is named after Flora Mann Jones, an early resident.

History
Graves in Flora's cemetery date to 1821.  A post office was established in 1883.  That same year, Flora became a stop on the newly constructed Yazoo and Mississippi Valley Railroad.  The railroad depot is now a museum, and is listed on the National Register of Historic Places.

Flora was incorporated in 1886.

Mississippi Ordnance Plant
In 1941, the Mississippi Ordnance Plant was constructed north of Flora to produce propellant and igniter charges for large-caliber guns during World War II.  The site also had firing ranges for sub-machine guns, rifles, anti-aircraft guns, live grenades, and demolition explosives. A notable employee was science fiction writer Cyril M. Kornbluth.

The plant was operated by General Tire. It generally hired African-American men only for jobs as janitors, yard workers, freight loaders, truck drivers and maintenance workers. They were allowed to work in the higher paying production jobs only if white men were not available.  African-American women were employed only as maids and cafeteria helpers. In 1942, a local group of African-American citizens met to protest the company's policy.

After the war, the Defense Department declared the site as surplus in 1945. The army certified it as "completely decontaminated". But standards since then are more refined and the site was dangerously contaminated due to the production and heavy armaments.

In 1947, the Mississippi Department of Education planned to adapt part of the plant into a vocational school for African Americans, until white residents protested to the governor, stating that property values would be ruined.

One of the reinforced bunkers eventually became used for the "Southern Vital Records" storage facility. In 1977, a local high school student found an abandoned M-2A2 tank in a wooded area.

National Bio and Agro-Defense Facility
In 2008, the U.S. Department of Homeland Security announced that the Flora Industrial Park was one of six locations in the United States being considered for the construction of a new National Bio and Agro-Defense Facility. Some people were concerned about dangers from biological research. 

Flora's mayor, Scott Greaves, had responded to opposition to the facility in 2007, saying: "Education is the whole key to it. You have to find the people who are concerned and educate them. In the end, you're still going to have a few idiots".  Manhattan, Kansas was finally selected as the site for the new facility.

Geography

Just outside the Flora city limits lies a forest collection of petrified wood, the Mississippi Petrified Forest. It is said to be the only such forest east of the Mississippi River.

Demographics

2020 census

As of the 2020 United States Census, there were 1,647 people, 652 households, and 503 families residing in the town.

2000 census
As of the census of 2000, there were 1,546 people, 575 households, and 416 families residing in the town. The population density was 454.2 people per square mile (175.6/km2). There were 606 housing units at an average density of 178.0 per square mile (68.8/km2). The racial makeup of the town was 57.05% White, 42.04% African American, 0.65% Native American, 0.06% from other races, and 0.19% from two or more races. Hispanic or Latino of any race were 0.32% of the population.

There were 575 households, out of which 36.5% had children under the age of 18 living with them, 44.7% were married couples living together, 25.0% had a female householder with no husband present, and 27.5% were non-families. 25.4% of all households were made up of individuals, and 9.7% had someone living alone who was 65 years of age or older. The average household size was 2.69 and the average family size was 3.21.

In the town, the population was spread out, with 29.3% under the age of 18, 9.4% from 18 to 24, 30.8% from 25 to 44, 19.7% from 45 to 64, and 10.9% who were 65 years of age or older. The median age was 32 years. For every 100 females, there were 86.3 males. For every 100 females age 18 and over, there were 82.2 males.

The median income for a household in the town was $38,077, and the median income for a family was $41,324. Males had a median income of $31,786 versus $22,176 for females. The per capita income for the town was $16,075. About 18.7% of families and 25.3% of the population were below the poverty line, including 44.4% of those under age 18 and 10.6% of those age 65 or over.

Education
The Town of Flora is served by the Madison County School District.

It is zoned to East Flora Elementary. Residents are in turn zoned to Madison Middle School, Rosa Scott 9th Grade, and Madison Central High School.

The Tri-County Academy, a private school, is located in Flora.

Media
Flora is served both by radio station WYAB 103.9 FM and The Flora News, a monthly free community newspaper.

Notable people
 Maurice Black, member of the Mississippi House of Representatives
 E. C. Coleman, professional basketball player
 Parys Haralson, professional football player
 Paul "Wine" Jones, blues singer and guitarist
 Belle Kearney, temperance reformer, suffragist, teacher, white supremacist, and first female Mississippi State Senator in 1923

References

External links
Town of Flora
Flora Area Chamber of Commerce 

Towns in Madison County, Mississippi
Towns in Mississippi
Jackson metropolitan area, Mississippi